Dechloromonas aromatica is a gram negative, facultative anaerobe bacterium from the genus of Dechloromonas which was isolated of the Potomac River sludge in the mid-Atlantic coast of the United States and occurs in environment soil. Dechloromonas aromatica has the ability to degrade benzene anaerobically, reduce perchlorate and oxidize chlorobenzoate, toluene and xylene.

References

Rhodocyclaceae
Bacteria described in 2002